Enver Ibërshimi (born 30 November 1939 in Elbasan) is an Albanian retired football player who was a one club man, having spent the entirely of his career with Labinoti Elbasan between 1960 and 1973. He scored 92 league goals for the club throughout his career, making him the current 17th top goalscorer in Albanian history.

International career
He made his debut for Albania in an October 1963 European Championship qualification match against Denmark in Tirana, it proved to be his sole international match.

References

External links

1939 births
Living people
Footballers from Elbasan
Albanian footballers
Association football forwards
Albania under-23 international footballers
Albania international footballers
KF Elbasani players
Kategoria Superiore players
Albanian football managers